Matra Timba is a village and former princely state on Saurashtra peninsula in Gujarat, western India.

History 
The minor princely state in Jhalawar prant, ruled by Kathi Chieftains, comprised the single village. It had a population of 352 in 1901, yielding a state revenue of 2,727 Rupees (1903-4, mostly from land) and a paying a tribute of 362 Rupees, to the British and Junagadh State.

External links and sources 
History
 Imperial Gazetteer, on dsal.uchicago.edu

Princely states of Gujarat